Luis Carlos Villegas Echeverri (Pereira, Risaralda, June 16, 1957) is Colombian politician, lawyer and economist. He was the Governor of Risaralda, and previously served as the Colombian Ambassador to the United States. He served as the Minister of Defence from June 2015 to August 2018.

References

Colombian politicians
1957 births
Living people
Colombian Ministers of Defense
Ambassadors of Colombia to the United States